The 1953 Boston College Eagles baseball team represented Boston College in the 1953 NCAA baseball season. The Eagles played their home games at Alumni Field. The team was coached by John Temple in his 4th year at Boston College.

The Eagles won the District II Playoff to advanced to the College World Series, where they were defeated by the Lafayette Leopards.

The Eagles 11 wins entering the College World Series are a record for the fewest by a team entering the College World Series.

Roster

Schedule 

! style="" | Regular Season
|- valign="top" 

|- align="center" bgcolor="#ccffcc"
| 1 || April 11 || at  || Unknown • Kingston, Rhode Island || 3–1 || 1–0 || –
|- align="center" bgcolor="#ccffcc"
| 2 || April 16 ||  || Alumni Field • Boston, Massachusetts || 8–2 || 2–0 || 1–0
|- align="center" bgcolor="#ccffcc"
| 3 || April 18 ||  || Alumni Field • Boston, Massachusetts || 4–2 || 3–0 || 2–0
|- align="center" bgcolor="#ffcccc"
| 4 || April 22 || Rhode Island || Alumni Field • Boston, Massachusetts || 4–8 || 3–1 || 2–0
|- align="center" bgcolor="#ccffcc"
| 5 || April 25 ||  || Alumni Field • Boston, Massachusetts || 7–4 || 4–1 || 2–0
|-

|- align="center" bgcolor="#ffcccc"
| 6 || May 6 ||  || Alumni Field • Boston, Massachusetts || 1–5 || 4–2 || 2–1
|- align="center" bgcolor="#ccffcc"
| 7 || May 11 ||  || Alumni Field • Boston, Massachusetts || 7–6 || 5–2 || 3–1
|- align="center" bgcolor="#ccffcc"
| 8 || May 25 ||  || Alumni Field • Boston, Massachusetts || 5–4 || 6–2 || 4–1
|- align="center" bgcolor="#ccffcc"
| 9 || May 28 || at Northeastern || Parsons Field • Brookline, Massachusetts || 12–4 || 7–2 || 5–1
|- align="center" bgcolor="#ccffcc"
| 10 || May 30 || at  || Fitton Field • Worcester, Massachusetts || 9–2 || 8–2 || 5–1
|-

|-
|-
! style="" | Postseason
|- valign="top"

|- align="center" bgcolor="#ccffcc"
| 11 || June 1 || vs  || Fitton Field • Worcester, Massachusetts || 10–6 || 9–2 || 5–1
|- align="center" bgcolor="#ccffcc"
| 12 || June 2 || vs  || Fitton Field • Worcester, Massachusetts || 9–2 || 10–2 || 5–1
|-

|- align="center" bgcolor="#ffcccc"
| 13 || June 3 || at  || Joseph J. O'Donnell Field • Boston, Massachusetts || 9–4 || 10–3 || 5–1
|- align="center" bgcolor="#ccffcc"
| 14 || June 6 || at  || Unknown • Medford, Massachusetts || 11–4 || 11–3 || 6–1
|- align="center" bgcolor="#ffcccc"
| 15 || June 8 || Holy Cross || Alumni Field • Boston, Massachusetts || 1–8 || 11–4 || 6–1
|- align="center" bgcolor="#ffcccc"
| 16 || June 9 || at Holy Cross || Fitton Field • Worcester, Massachusetts || 6–20 || 11–5 || 6–1
|-

|- align="center" bgcolor="#ccffcc"
| 17 || June 11 || vs Houston || Omaha Municipal Stadium • Omaha, Nebraska || 4–1 || 12–5 || 6–1
|- align="center" bgcolor="#ffcccc"
| 18 || June 12 || vs Michigan || Omaha Municipal Stadium • Omaha, Nebraska || 2–6 || 12–6 || 6–1
|- align="center" bgcolor="#ccffcc"
| 19 || June 13 || vs Duke || Omaha Municipal Stadium • Omaha, Nebraska || 7–6 || 13–6 || 6–1
|- align="center" bgcolor="#ffcccc"
| 20 || June 14 || vs Lafayette || Omaha Municipal Stadium • Omaha, Nebraska || 1–2 || 13–7 || 6–1
|-

|-
|

References 

Boston College Eagles baseball seasons
Boston College Eagles baseball
College World Series seasons